Kazimierz Grochowski (1873-1937) was a Polish mining engineer, explorer, geologist, ethnographer, archaeologist, and writer specializing in studies of Siberia, Mongolia, and Manchuria.

Works
Polacy na Dalekim Wschodzie (1928)

References
Robert Niedźwiedzki, 2008. Kazimierz Grochowski (1873–1937) - zapomniany badacz złota Syberii. Przegląd Geologiczny, 6: 460-464; 
Edward Kajdański, The Silk Roads and engineer Kazimierz Grochowski

1873 births
1937 deaths
Polish explorers
Polish mining engineers
20th-century Polish geologists
Polish ethnographers
20th-century Polish archaeologists
Polish male writers
Explorers of Siberia
Explorers of Central Asia